Paul Harris may refer to:

Entertainment
 Paul Harris (actor) (1917–1985), African-American character actor
 Paul Harris (artist) (1925–2018), American artist and sculptor
 Paul Harris (author) (1948–2018), author and publisher, based in Scotland
 Paul Harris (choreographer), English
 Paul Harris (DJ), English DJ, producer and member of house music group Dirty Vegas
 Paul Harris (film critic) (born 1950), Australian
 Paul Harris (magician), American
 Paul Harris (musician), American keyboards player and musician
 Paul Harris (Home and Away), fictional character in Australian soap opera Home and Away

Sports
 Paul Harris (American football) (born 1954), American football player
 Paul Harris (basketball) (born 1986), American
 Paul Harris (Bedfordshire cricketer) (born 1955), English cricketer for Bedfordshire 1976–80
 Paul Harris (South African cricketer) (born 1978), for Northerns, Titans, Western Province and Warwickshire
 Rousimar Palhares (born 1980), Brazilian mixed martial artist (known in America as Paul Harris)

Politics
 Sir Paul Harris, 2nd Baronet (1595–1644), English baronet and Surveyor of the Ordnance
 Paul Harris (politician) (born 1953), member of the Washington House of Representatives
 Paul Clinton Harris (born 1964), Virginia House of Delegates

Other
 Paul Harris (public servant) (born 1946), head of Electoral Commission in New Zealand
 Paul L. Harris (born 1946), child psychologist
 Paul Harris (Rotary) (1868–1947), lawyer who founded the Rotary Club in 1905
 Paul Harris, name on the passport of the British activist Tommy Robinson (real name Stephen Yaxley-Lennon) a founder of the English Defence League)
 Paul Harris, lawyer, chairman of the Hong Kong Bar Association from 2021

See also
 Paul Harriss (born 1954), Australian politician